Sclerotiorin is an antimicrobial Penicillium frequentans isolate. Sclerotiorin is an aldose reductase inhibitor (IC50=0.4 μM) as well as a reversible lipoxygenase inhibitor (IC50=4.2 μM).

Notes

Chloroarenes
Acetate esters
Heterocyclic compounds with 2 rings
Oxygen heterocycles